Randy Kevin Dzierzawski, Jr. (born June 28, 1991) is an American professional soccer player who plays as a midfielder.

Career
Dzierzawski played college soccer for the Dartmouth Big Green, before beginning his professional career in Scotland with Queen of the South. He made his professional debut in the Scottish Championship on September 14, 2013 as a 66th-minute substitute for Derek Young in a 0–1 loss to Raith Rovers at Palmerston Park.

Dzierzawksi was loaned out to Peterhead on January 22, 2015, for the rest of the Scottish League One season. He made his debut nine days later, playing the full 90 minutes and scoring in a 2–0 win over Stenhousemuir at the Balmoor Stadium.

On May 28, 2015 he transferred to Peterhead, on the basis that he was unlikely to retain a work permit if he were to remain at Queen of the South.

During his first season with Peterhead, where Dzierzawski made 42 appearances, the club finished in 3rd place qualifying for the Scottish Championship playoff as well as leading the club to its first ever Cup final against Rangers at Hampden Park. He was released at the end of the 2016–17 season following the club's relegation to Scottish League Two.

References

External links

1991 births
Living people
American soccer players
Queen of the South F.C. players
Peterhead F.C. players
Scottish Professional Football League players
Association football midfielders
American expatriate soccer players
American expatriate sportspeople in Scotland
Expatriate footballers in Scotland
Dartmouth Big Green men's soccer players